Ready Steady No is a 2019 Pakistani romantic comedy film. The film features Amna Ilyas, Salman Shahid, Faisal Saif, Zain Afzal, Marhoom Ahmed Bilal, Nargis Rasheed and Ismail Tara. It is written, directed, and produced by Hisham Bin Munawwar. It released on 19 July 2019 under the banners of Hum Films and Eveready Films.

Cast 
 Faisal Saif as Faisal
 Amna Ilyas as Razia
 Salman Shahid as Chaudhry Sahab; Razia's father
 Zain Afzal as Maulana
 Ismail Tara as Faisal's father
 Nargis Rasheed as Faisal's mother
 Nayyar Ejaz as a palmist
 Ashraf Khan
 Marhoom Ahmad Bilal as Advocate Mazhar Fakhar
 Saleem Albela
 Muneer Ahmed as Detective Muneer; Razia's cousin

Soundtrack 
Film music has been directed by Baqir Abbas and produced by Hassan Badshah.

Critical reception 
Omair Alavi wrote that the film "makes your belief stronger in clean comedy" because it "delivers a clean comedy" on "situations, more than dialogues." Shafiq Ul Hasan rated 2 out of 5 stars and wrote in The Express Tribune that it "is an earnest attempt" and "offers a fresh script" to "those who like stage plays and prefer loud comedy." Sonia Ashraf of Dawn Images said that the "plot for this romantic comedy sounds simple enough", unfortunately "it fizzled out" due to "a poor script". Asjad Khan of OY! wrote that it "is an entertaining film, with a social message" and "a worthy effort for "an independent film maker", however, "it could have been better if" focused a "bit more in building the relationship between" the lead pair. Yousuf Mehmood rated 3 out of 5 stars and wrote on PakistaniCinema.net "the film drags a little, and its cinematic appeal is lacking" but it is "a purely comedic film where the audience was howling laughing, along with their families." Usman Ghafoor of Gulf News commented, "The humour here is essentially situational and verbal", but "throughout the narrative, the film keeps returning to slapstick", and "cinematography is perhaps its other weak point." Hassan Hassan of Galaxy Lollywood said that it is a "socially relevant" film whose "cast offer moments of fun with their acting" but rated only 1.5 star out of 5 and added that "the cast alone, isn't able to save the film from being a disastrously boring affair" as it is not entertaining.

Accolades

References

External links 
 
 
 Soundtrack at Patari.pk

2010s Urdu-language films
2019 films
2019 romantic comedy films
Films set in Lahore
Films shot in Lahore
Hum films
Pakistani romantic comedy films
Films about weddings